The Belfast School of Art, is a School in the Ulster University Faculty of Arts, Humanities and Social Sciences and is physically located at the Belfast campus. Following the results of the Research Excellence Framework 2014 Ulster is ranked within the top ten for research in Art and Design in the UK.

The School hosts an exhibition of graduating  students work annually at the beginning of June each year. This exhibition is open to the public and free entry.

History
The school was established in Belfast in 1849; it moved to the current location in Cathedral Quarter later. After the millennium, the Belfast campus was reconstructed as part of a multi-million pound refurbishment which saw the School's floorspace expanded and significant investment. The schools now resides in a purpose built complex of studios, workshops and social spaces. It benefits from views of the Cathedral Quarter, the Titanic Quarter and the £250 million new Ulster University Greater Belfast City Campus development.

Academics
The Belfast School of Art is the largest Art and Design facility on the island with a wide range of disciplines and staff who are active in their creative and professional careers and closely networked in Ireland, the UK and internationally. As the main Art and Design provider for nearly 170 years, many leading artists and Designers have passed through its doors including John Luke, TP Flanagan and, more recently 2 Turner prize winners. The School has a number of Undergraduate degrees, Masters programmes and Doctoral provision.

Programmes include:

 BDes (Hons) Animation
 BA (Hons) Art & Design (Foundation Year for specialist degrees)
 BDes (Hons) Games Design
 BDes (Hons) Graphic Design and Illustration
 BDes (Hons) Interaction Design
 BA (Hons) Fine Art
 BA (Hons) Photography with Video
 BA (Hons) Product Design
 BA (Hons) Textile Art, Design and Fashion
 MA Animation
 MSc Art Psychotherapy
 MSc Fashion & Textile Retail Management
 MFA Fine Art
 MA Games Design
 MFA Photography
 MFA Photography [online]
 MA UX and Service Design

The School is regular host to international artists and visiting scholars; it offers the opportunity for excelling students to study abroad and welcomes students from other places for courses, exchanges and summer schools.

Unique, a Students' Union led initiative, opened a shop on campus in September 2017 to allow the public to view and purchase work made by students, staff and alumni. The custom made shop interior was also designed by students and it staffed by placement students. There is also a gallery on campus and the School's staff play an active role in civic and cultural life in Belfast and beyond.

Around 50 Phd researchers investigate subjects relevant to art, design and the creative industries in a recently refurbished Doctoral student Hub. The School has over 3 decades experience in successful supervision of PhD with art practice. The School has had 37 successful doctoral students between 2008 and 2013, together these students amassed £4.25 million in research fundraising. The Doctoral College supports all doctoral students in the Faculty and School.

Research
The Research Institute for Art and Design, RIAD, was established in 2004 at Ulster University. It supports research in a wide range of Art and Design disciplines. Recent research grants have includes societally relevant research into design for health and creative industries. Art works by staff and alumni are in leading museums and collections around the globe.

Research ranking

2014
In the Research Excellence Framework (REF) 2014 for Art, Ulster University, was ranked third overall in the UK for 4* research and sixth in the UK in the quality index.

Governance
The School is led by Head of School Dr Brian Dixon, who reports to the Executive Dean of the Faculty of Arts Humanities and Social Sciences in Ulster University. The Head of School works closely with the Research Director for Art and Design Prof Justin Magee and with the School Officer, supported by a team of Course Directors. The School makes effective use of industry and real world advisory groups and networks to ensure that programmes and staff are relevant. Students are encouraged to undertake placement experience.

Heads of School have included: 
 Dr Brian Dixon (July 2022 - ongoing)
 Louise O'Boyle (2019 - 2022)
 Professor Karen Fleming (2017 - 2019)
 Professor Paul Seawright (2013 - 2017)
 Professor Barbara Dass
 Professor Ian Montgomery

Associate Heads of School have included:
 Dr Cherie Driver (April 2021 - ongoing)
 Louise O'Boyle (4 July 2018 - October 2019)
 Rachel Dickson (1 June 2014 - 1 June 2018)
 Deborah Fraser

Research Directors have included:
 Dr Justin Magee (2017 - ongoing)
 Professor Karen Fleming (2008 - 2017)

References

External links
 External Main Site
 Internal Main Site

Ulster University
Art schools in the United Kingdom
1849 establishments in Ireland
Educational institutions established in 1849